is a Japanese voice actor affiliated with Stay Luck. After working as a stage actor, he used connections from his sister to become a voice actor and made his debut as Masamune Shiga in Tokyo Twilight Ghost Hunters. Since Tokyo Twilight Ghost Hunters, some of his more prominent roles include Nishiki Sasa in Love Kome, Ritsu Shikishima in Caligula, and Taiga in Tribe Nine.

Biography
Chiharu Sawashiro was born in Tokyo on December 20, 1987. Chiharu is the younger brother of voice actress Miyuki Sawashiro. Miyuki had been voice acting since she was in middle school. At first, Chiharu was a bit skeptical of voice acting, since it was a lot less popular at the time. However, as voice acting got more popular, his peers continued to ask him questions about his sister. Chiharu later became a stage actor during college before he decided to give voice acting a try after voicing additional voices in the Dog & Scissors series with the Dead Stock Unit. Using connections from his sister, he was able to enter vocational school and eventually made his full debut as a voice actor with Masamuse Shiga in Tokyo Twilight Ghost Hunters.

In August 2021, he was diagnosed with COVID-19, but was asymptomatic.

Filmography

TV series
2016
 Cheer Boys!! as Takeru Andō
 All Out!! as Natsuki Ise
 Show by Rock!! as Argon

2017
 Love Kome as Nishiki Sasa
 Yu-Gi-Oh! VRAINS as Naoki Shima

2018
 Caligula as Ritsu Shikishima
 Mr. Tonegawa as Yūichirō Nagata

2019
 Manaria Friends as Heinlein

2020
 A3! as Banri Settsu

2021
 Sushi Sumo as Yobidashi Gari

2022
 Tribe Nine as Taiga
 The Prince of Tennis II: U-17 World Cup as Elmar Siegfried
 Fuuto PI as Shun Makura

2023
 High Card as Bobby Ball
 The Fruit of Evolution 2 as Demiolos

Films
2021
 Mobile Suit Gundam: Hathaway's Flash as Kenji Mitsuda

Video games
2014
 Tokyo Twilight Ghost Hunters as Masamune Shiga

2016
 The Caligula Effect as the main character
 7'scarlet as Sosuke Kenpira

2017
 A3! as Banri Settsu

2019
 The King of Fighters for Girls as Joe Higashi

2021
 Neo: The World Ends with You as Fret

Dubbing
Doom Patrol (Victor Stone / Cyborg (Joivan Wade))
Midsommar (Mark (Will Poulter))
The Legend of Vox Machina (Scanlan Shorthalt)

References

External links
 Official agency profile 
 

1987 births
Living people
Komazawa University alumni
Japanese male video game actors
Japanese male voice actors
Male voice actors from Tokyo
21st-century Japanese male actors